Aksay is a rural locality (a selo) and the administrative center of Aksayskoye Rural Settlement, Oktyabrsky District, Volgograd Oblast, Russia. The population was 1,559 as of 2010. There are 19 streets.

Geography 
Aksay is located in steppe, in the valley of the Aksay Yesaulovsky River, 32 km east of Oktyabrsky (the district's administrative centre) by road. Shelestovo is the nearest rural locality.

References 

Rural localities in Oktyabrsky District, Volgograd Oblast